Rezaabad (also Romanized as Reẕāābād and Rezāābād) is a village in Bardesareh Rural District, Oshtorinan District, Borujerd County, Lorestan Province, Iran. At the 2006 census, its population was 413, in 107 families.

References 

Towns and villages in Borujerd County